This page lists all cases of the Judicial Committee of the Privy Council originating in Canada, and decided in the years 1920 to 1929.

From 1867 to 1949, the JCPC was the highest court of appeal for Canada (and, separately, for Newfoundland). During this period, its decisions on Canadian appeals were binding precedent on all Canadian courts, including the Supreme Court of Canada. Any decisions from this era that the Supreme Court of Canada has not overruled since gaining appellate supremacy in 1949 remain good law, and continue to bind all Canadian courts other than the Supreme Court.

The Parliament of Canada abolished appeals to the JCPC of criminal cases in 1933 and civil cases in 1949. Ongoing cases that had begun before those dates remained appealable to the JCPC. The final JCPC ruling on a Canadian case was rendered in 1959, in Ponoka-Calmar Oils v Wakefield.

Cases

Summary by year and result

Summary by jurisdiction and court appealed from

See also
 List of Canadian appeals to the Judicial Committee of the Privy Council, 1867–1869
 List of Canadian appeals to the Judicial Committee of the Privy Council, 1870–1879
 List of Canadian appeals to the Judicial Committee of the Privy Council, 1880–1889
 List of Canadian appeals to the Judicial Committee of the Privy Council, 1890–1899
 List of Canadian appeals to the Judicial Committee of the Privy Council, 1900–1909
 List of Canadian appeals to the Judicial Committee of the Privy Council, 1910–1919
 List of Canadian appeals to the Judicial Committee of the Privy Council, 1930–1939
 List of Canadian appeals to the Judicial Committee of the Privy Council, 1940–1949
 List of Canadian appeals to the Judicial Committee of the Privy Council, 1950–1959

Sources
 British and Irish Legal Information Institute:  Privy Council Decisions
 1920 Privy Council Decisions
 1921 Privy Council Decisions
 1922 Privy Council Decisions
 1923 Privy Council Decisions
 1924 Privy Council Decisions
 1925 Privy Council Decisions
 1926 Privy Council Decisions
 1927 Privy Council Decisions
 1928 Privy Council Decisions
 1929 Privy Council Decisions

References

1920s in Canada
Canadian case law lists
Canada